Mount Kilcoy is a rural locality in the Somerset Region, Queensland, Australia.

Geography 
Mount Kilcoy occupies a valley drained by Kilcoy Creek at the southern end of the Conondale Range. Kilcoy Weir was built at Mount Kilcoy and is able to retain a maximum of 158 megalitres. The flatter land along the creek is used for agriculture while the sloping terrain towards the north, east and western boundaries remains vegetated.

History 
The locality takes its name from the mountain which in turn takes its name from the pastoral station established by brothers Evan and Colin Mackenzie in 1842, which in turns takes its name from Kilcoy in Ross-shire, Scotland.

Mount Kilcoy State School opened on 18 January 1909 with a single teacher.

At the  the locality recorded a population of 255.

Education 
Mount Kilcoy State School is a government primary (Prep-6) school for boys and girls at 251 Jenkinsons Road. In 2017, the school had an enrolment of 129 students with 13 teachers (8 full-time equivalent) and 7 non-teaching staff (5 full-time equivalent).

References

External links

Suburbs of Somerset Region
Localities in Queensland